The 15th Cook Islands Parliament is a previous term of the Parliament of the Cook Islands. Its composition was determined by the 2018 elections on 14 June 2018.

Initial party standings

Members

Initial MPs

Summary of changes
 Toka Hagai resigned on 1 November 2018 after allegations of treating. In December 2018 the Court of Appeal ruled that Tina Browne had won the seat.
 Tony Armstrong died in November 2018. A by-election for the vacant Ivirua seat was held on 21 January 2019, and was won by Agnes Armstrong.
 Te-Hani Brown resigned from the Democratic party to support the government in January 2019. She was subsequently re-elected in a by-election.
 Henry Puna resigned on 24 March 2021 to take up the position of Secretary General of the Pacific Islands Forum Secretariat. Akaiti Puna was elected in the resulting by-election.

References

Politics of the Cook Islands
2018 in the Cook Islands